KMUE (88.1 FM) is a radio station broadcasting a Variety format. Licensed to Eureka, California, United States, it serves the Eureka area.  The station is owned by Redwood Community Radio, Inc. KMUE is a repeater for KMUD.

On March 22, 2012, KMUE moved from 88.3 FM to 88.1 FM and raised power to 10,000 watts.

See also
Community radio
List of Pacifica Radio stations and affiliates
List of community radio stations in the United States

External links

MUE
Community radio stations in the United States
Mass media in Humboldt County, California